The Shepparton Football Netball Club, nicknamed the Bears, is an Australian rules football and netball club in the Goulburn Valley Football League. The team, known as the "Bears", (once known as the "maroons"), are based in Shepparton and play their home games at the Deakin Reserve, the premier football ground in the town. They share the ground with the Shepparton United Football Club.

History

Football was played locally in and around Shepparton from the early 1880s, it was not until the formation of Goulburn Valley District Football Association in 1894 that a coherent competitive framework for the sport emerged.

Shepparton was one of six founder members of the GVDFA. It won its first flag in 1899, followed by another four years later, and then from 1906 until the competition went into recess because of world war one it established a veritable premiership dynasty, going top no fewer than six times in nine seasons. From 1911 until early in the 1913 season in particular, Shepparton was widely regarded, and indeed often described in the local press, as ‘invincible’. At the end of the 1913 season this evaluation was further enhanced when Shepparton beat South Bendigo by 3 points in a special challenge match for ‘the championship of the north’.

After world war one Shepparton continued to enjoy regular success, but they left the GVFL in 1939 because the league decided to change from a Wednesday competition to a Saturday.  They joined the Central Goulburn Valley Football League and only returned to the GVFL in 1951.

Hafey coached the club to a hattrick of flags before Richmond offered him the main coaching position in the VFL. Hafey made sure to sign the best young talent in the GVFL and in his second year got the Tigers a flag.

Further premierships followed in 1968-9 under Ken Rowe, and in 1972-3 under Bill Sykes. Since then the club has enjoyed only sporadic success, at least by its own lofty standards, but there is little doubt that dynastic potential still simmers not far beneath the surface.

Football Premierships
Seniors

VFL/AFL players

 Steven King – , 
 Shannon Byrnes – 
 David Code – 
 Lachlan Ash - 
 Will Brodie - 
 Jordon Butts -

References

External links
 australianfootball: Shepparton
 Official Club Website

Australian rules football clubs in Victoria (Australia)
Goulburn Valley Football League clubs